George Rex Andrews (September 21, 1808 – December 5, 1873) was a U.S. Representative from New York.

Biography
Born in Ticonderoga, New York, Andrews attended the common schools and was graduated from the Albany Law School. He was admitted to the bar in 1836 and commenced the practice of law in Ticonderoga.

Career
Andrews was elected as a Whig to the Thirty-first Congress and served from March 4, 1849 to March 3, 1851.

After his single term in Congress, Andrews abandoned politics and the legal profession altogether and moved to Oshkosh, Wisconsin, in 1852 and engaged in the timber and lumber business until his death.

Death
Anderson died in Oshkosh, Wisconsin, on December 5, 1873,(age 65 years, 72 days). He is interred at Riverside Cemetery in Oshkosh.

References

External links

1808 births
1873 deaths
Albany Law School alumni
Whig Party members of the United States House of Representatives from New York (state)
People from Ticonderoga, New York
19th-century American politicians